Connecticut's 53rd House of Representatives district elects one member of the Connecticut House of Representatives. It consists of the towns of Ashford, Willington, and parts of Tolland. It has been represented by Republican Tammy Nuccio since 2021.

Recent elections

2020

2018

2016

2014

2013 special

References

53